Mlungisi Raphael "Professor" Ngubane (born 20 February 1956 in Durban, KwaZulu-Natal) is a former South African football (soccer) player and coach currently managing National First Division club Thanda Royal Zulu. He previously coached Durban Bush Bucks, Maritzburg United, Bush Bucks, Black Leopards and Namibia among others.

References

1956 births
Living people
Sportspeople from Durban
Zulu people
South African soccer managers
South African soccer players
Black Leopards F.C. players
Durban Bush Bucks players
Namibia national football team managers
Expatriate football managers in Namibia 
South African expatriate sportspeople in Namibia
Association footballers not categorized by position